The D-Terminal or D-tanshi is a type of analog video connector found on Japanese consumer electronics, typically HDTV, DVD, Blu-ray, D-VHS and HD DVD devices. It was developed by the EIAJ (Electronic Industry Association of Japan) in its standard, RC-5237, for use in digital satellite broadcast tuners.  In appearance it is a small flat trapezoidal connector, the same connector as the AAUI connector used by Apple Computer for some time to connect to ethernet.

Some items sold outside Japan use the connector as well. Notable examples are Canon's XH-A1 DVC high-definition camcorder and Panasonic's AG-HVX200 DVCPro HD camcorder.

D1~D5 types

A D-Terminal connector carries a component video signal (YPBPR). A device with a D5 connector can understand and display the following video signals:
D1 480i (525i)： 720 × 480 interlaced
D2 480p (525p)： 720 × 480 progressive
D3 1080i (1125i)： 1920 × 1080 interlaced
D4 720p (750p)： 1280 × 720 progressive
D5 1080p (1125p)： 1920 × 1080 progressive

A device with a D-Terminal connector supports that level and lower D-Terminal signal.  For example, a D4 connector can be used with a D4, D3, D2, or D1 signal, but not with a D5 signal.

It is possible to use a simple breakout cable to connect a D-Terminal connector to a standard 3 RCA jack or BNC component connection.

Compatibility Issues
It is not always a given that output devices support all lower versions of the standard, so customers must take care to buy compatible products. For example, the PlayStation Portable (PSP-2000) initially supported only the 480p (D2) mode. System Software Ver. 5.00 added 480i (D1) support for the "PS one Classics" games, but not native PSP games. The later PSP-3000 and PSP Go models have 480i support for all games.

See also
Amphenol connector
D-subminiature

References

External links
 Q&A - No.31999/10 What Is a "D-Terminal"? - A new terminal standard for connecting digital satellite tuners with TV sets.
 D-Terminal to Component adapter cable

Analog video connectors